Arnaud Clément and Édouard Roger-Vasselin were the defending champions, but they elected to defend their title with different partners.Clément partnered up with David Guez, but they withdrew before their quarterfinal match against Harsh Mankad and Adil Shamasdin.Roger-Vasselin partnered up with Nicolas Mahut and they won in the final 6–2, 6–4, over Mankad and Shamasdin.

Seeds

Draw

Draw

External links
 Main Draw

Challenger DCNS de Cherbourg - Doubles
2010 Doubles